Crocketford (also frequently ) also known as Ninemile Bar, as it is approximately equidistant between Castle Douglas and Dumfries, is a village in the historical county of Kirkcudbrightshire in the Dumfries and Galloway council area near the boundary between Scotland and England. It is located on the A75 road around 9 miles west of Dumfries. Crocketford is one of only two settlements that are not bypassed by the A75 (along with Springholm which is around 2 miles to the south-west).

The Buchanites were the followers of Elspeth Buchan, (1738-1791) who claimed to be the Woman Clad with the Sun from the Book of Revelation. After expulsion from Dumfriesshire they eventually settled at Newhouse in the village. A small burial ground at the property contained the remains of various members of the sect.

References

Villages in Dumfries and Galloway